The simple station Escuela Militar is part of the TransMilenio mass-transit system of Bogotá, Colombia, opened in the year 2000.

Location

The station is located in northwestern Bogotá, specifically on Calle 80, with Carrera 51.

It serves the Gaitán and La Patria neighborhoods.

History

In 2000, phase one of the TransMilenio system was opened between Portal de la 80 and Tercer Milenio, including this station.

The station is named Escuela Militar due to its location in front of the General José María Cordova military school.

The station is close to the major roads NQS and Avenida Suba. It serves as an interchange for passengers on the NQS, Suba, and Calle 80 lines of the system.

Station Services

Old trunk services

Main Line Service

Feeder routes

This station does not have connections to feeder routes.

Inter-city service

This station does not have inter-city service.

External links
TransMilenio

See also
Bogotá
TransMilenio
List of TransMilenio Stations

TransMilenio